Ulaipalota Tauatama (born 7 February 1970) is a Samoan boxer. He competed in the men's featherweight event at the 1988 Summer Olympics.

References

External links
 

1970 births
Living people
Samoan male boxers
Olympic boxers of Samoa
Boxers at the 1988 Summer Olympics
Place of birth missing (living people)
Featherweight boxers